Press Ganey Associates is a South Bend, Indiana-based health care company known for developing and distributing patient satisfaction surveys. As of January 2017, its Medical Practice Survey was the most widely used outpatient satisfaction survey in the United States.

History
Press Ganey Associates was founded in 1985 by medical anthropologist Irwin Press and sociologist-statistician Rod Ganey, both of whom were then professors at the University of Notre Dame. Over the next fifteen years, the company's client base, which initially consisted of only a few hospitals, grew steadily in size.

In 1993, Mel Hall began working at Press Ganey, and in 2001, he became its CEO. He remained the company's CEO until stepping down in 2012 to found the Nashville-based medical staffing firm SpecialtyCare.

The Center for Medicare and Medicaid Services previously used Press Ganey's survey to measure patient satisfaction, but in 2012, after the survey was widely criticized, they replaced it with the Hospital Consumer Assessment of Healthcare Providers and Systems (HCAHPS). As of November 2016, Press Ganey's surveys are in use at more than 10,000 medical institutions.

In 2020, Press Ganey acquired NarrativeDx, a patented natural language processing platform built specifically for the language of healthcare. They also acquired Doctor.com, a digital platform in provider directories, online bookings and provider analysis.

Press Ganey acquired SPH Analytics, a company providing customer experience measurement and engagement for the health insurance industry in May 2021. SPH deploys an analytical and predictive approach to measure and report the consumer experience.

In April 2022, Press Ganey acquired the market research, customer experience and employee experience technology business, Forsta.

References

External links

1985 establishments in Indiana
Health care companies established in 1985
American companies established in 1985
Companies based in St. Joseph County, Indiana